Systems Analysis and Design, an interdisciplinary part of science, may refer to:

 Systems analysis, a method of studying a system by examining its component parts and their interactions
 Structured data analysis (systems analysis), analysing the flow of information within an organization with data-flow diagrams
 Systems design, the process of defining the architecture, components, and data of a system to satisfy specified requirements
 Object-oriented analysis and design, an approach to analysis and design of an application, system, or business that emphasizes modularity and visual modeling
 Service-oriented analysis and design, a method of Service-oriented modeling to design business systems 
 Structured analysis, methods in software engineering for converting specified requirements into software programs and hardware configurations
 Structured systems analysis and design method, a systems approach to the analysis and design of information systems

External links

 Association for Information Systems Special Interest Group on Systems Analysis & Design

See also 
 Structured data analysis (disambiguation)  

Structured data analysis (disambiguation)
This disambiguation page lists articles associated with the title Systems analysis and design. 
If an internal link led you here, you may wish to change the link to point directly to the intended article.